
Laguna Bolivia is a lake in the Marbán Province, Beni Department, Bolivia. At an elevation of 166 m, its surface area is 11 km².

Lakes of Beni Department